Marcus Picken (born 9 October 1979) is a former Australian rules footballer who played with the Brisbane Lions in the Australian Football League (AFL).

Picken is the son of former Collingwood star Billy Picken, older brother of former Western Bulldogs player Liam Picken, and cousin of former teammate and Brisbane Lions captain Jonathan Brown.

Recruited from the North Ballarat Rebels, he made his debut in 1998 after being selected by Brisbane in the 1997 AFL draft but was unable to make an impact in his limited opportunities. Picken played in eight of the first nine rounds of the 2001 AFL season before suffering a stress fracture in his foot which cost him a chance at a premiership.

Picken was traded in the 2001 draft, together with Shannon Rusca, to the Western Bulldogs in return for draft pick 49. He played some Wizard Cup games but despite being an emergency on one occasion was never able to make it into the seniors during the AFL season. However, his brother Liam would later play for the club.

References

External links
 
 

1979 births
Brisbane Lions players
Living people
Australian rules footballers from Victoria (Australia)
Greater Western Victoria Rebels players